Joaquín Sánchez de Toca y Calvo (24 September 1852 – 13 July 1942) was a Spanish conservative politician who served as Prime Minister in 1919.

Biography 
Born in Madrid on 24 September 1852, he became Mayor of Madrid in 1896, and held the office until 1897.

He served as Minister of Agriculture, Industry and Commerce from 23 October 1900 to 6 March 1901  during the Regency of Maria Christina of Austria. Already in the majority of Alfonso XIII of Spain, he served as Minister of the Navy (6 December 1902 – 20 July 1903) and as Minister of Justice (5 December 1903 – 16 December 1904) in the conservative governments of Francisco Silvela and Antonio Maura, respectively. He made a comeback as Mayor of Madrid in 1907.

In the later years of the constitutional period of the Alphonsine monarchy he was named Prime Minister replacing Antonio Maura. He led the cabinet from 20 July 1919 to 12 December 1919. He died on 13 July 1942 in Pozuelo de Alarcón.

References 

Industry ministers of Spain
Justice ministers of Spain
Prime Ministers of Spain
1852 births
1942 deaths
Mayors of Madrid
Conservative Party (Spain) politicians
People from Madrid
Presidents of the Senate of Spain